Jericho Brown (born April 14, 1976) is an American poet and writer. Born and raised in Shreveport, Louisiana, Brown has worked as an educator at institutions such as University of Houston, San Diego State University, and Emory University. His poems have been published in The Nation, New England Review, The New Republic, Oxford American, and The New Yorker, among others. He released his first book of prose and poetry, Please, in 2008. His second book,  The New Testament, was released in 2014. His 2019 collection of poems, The Tradition, garnered widespread critical acclaim.

Brown has won several accolades throughout his career, including a Whiting Award, an American Book Award, an Anisfield-Wolf Book Award, and the Pulitzer Prize for Poetry.

Life
Born Nelson Demery III and raised in Shreveport, Louisiana, Brown later changed his name and graduated from Dillard University, where he was initiated as a member of Alpha Phi Alpha fraternity, through the Beta Phi chapter, in the fall of 1995. He also graduated from the University of New Orleans with an MFA, and from the University of Houston with a Ph.D.

Brown was a teaching fellow in the English department at the University of Houston from 2002 to 2007, a visiting professor at San Diego State University's MFA program in spring 2009, and an assistant professor of English at the University of San Diego. He has also taught at numerous conferences and workshops, including the Iowa Summer Writing Festival at the University of Iowa. He is an associate professor of English and director of the Creative Writing Program at Emory University in Atlanta, Georgia. Previously, he worked as a speechwriter for the mayor of New Orleans.

In 2011, Brown received the 2011 National Endowment for the Arts Fellowship for Poetry. His poems have appeared in The Iowa Review, jubilat, The Nation, New England Review, The New Republic, Oxford American, The New Yorker, Enkare Review, and The Best American Poetry. He serves as an Assistant Editor at Callaloo.

His first book, Please (New Issues Poetry & Prose, 2008), won the American Book Award. His second book, a book of poetry titled The New Testament (Copper Canyon Press, 2014), won the 2015 Anisfield-Wolf Book Award.

Brown's third book, a collection of poems titled The Tradition (Copper Canyon Press, 2019), garnered widespread critical acclaim and won the Pulitzer Prize for Poetry.

Awards 
 2020 Pulitzer Prize for Poetry
 2016 Guggenheim Fellowship
 2015 Anisfield-Wolf Book Award
 2011 National Endowment for the Arts Fellowship for Poetry
 2009 American Book Award
 2009 Whiting Award
 2009–2010 fellowship at the Radcliffe Institute for Advanced Study at Harvard University

Works
 Books
 Please (New Issues Poetry & Prose, 2008). 
 The New Testament (Copper Canyon Press, 2014). 
 The Tradition (Copper Canyon Press, 2019). 

 Poems
"Thrive", Oxford American, October 2014
"Elegy", Rumpus, May 2009
"Rick", AGNI, March 2007
"To Be Seen", The Missouri Review, April 30, 2008

References

External links

 
 'Love in Contemporary American Gay Male Poetry in the Works of Richard Siken, Eduardo C Corral and Jericho Brown' Simeon Kronenberg, Cordite Poetry Review (2015).
 "Profile at The Whiting Foundation"
 "Danger by Desire: A Conversation between Jericho Brown & James Allen Hall", Boxcar Poetry Review, September 2009
 "Naming Each Place", Southern Spaces, March 4, 2010
 Until the Fulcrum Tips: A Conversation with Rita Dove and Jericho Brown, The Best American Poetry
 "Jericho Brown Presents The Phantastique 5", The Best American Poetry

21st-century American poets
African-American poets
Dillard University alumni
American gay writers
LGBT African Americans
American LGBT poets
Living people
University of Houston alumni
University of New Orleans alumni
University of San Diego faculty
Poets from Louisiana
American male poets
American Book Award winners
21st-century American male writers
Emory University faculty
National Endowment for the Arts Fellows
The Believer (magazine) people
Writers from Shreveport, Louisiana
LGBT people from Louisiana
1976 births
People with HIV/AIDS
Pulitzer Prize for Poetry winners
21st-century African-American writers
20th-century African-American people
African-American male writers
Gay poets